Viktors is a Latvian masculine given name. It is a cognate of the English given name Victor and may refer to:

Viktors Arājs (1910–1988), Latvian collaborator and Nazi SS officer
Viktors Alksnis (born 1950), Russian-born Latvian politician and former Soviet Air Force colonel
Viktors Bertholds (1921–2009) Latvian who was one of the last native speakers of the Livonian language
Viktors Bļinovs (born 1981), Latvian ice hockey forward
Viktors Dobrecovs (born 1977), Latvian football striker and manager
Viktors Eglītis (1877–1945), Latvian writer and art theorist
Viktors Hatuļevs (1955–1994), Latvian ice hockey defenseman and left winger 
Viktors Ignatjevs (born 1970), Latvian ice hockey player
Viktors Lācis (born 1977), Latvian middle-distance runner 
Viktors Lukaševičs (born 1972), Latvian footballer 
Viktors Morozs (born 1980), Latvian football midfielder
Viktors Ņesterenko (born 1954), Latvian football coach and former footballer
Viktors Pūpols (born 1934), Latvian-born American chess master
Viktors Ščerbatihs (born 1974) Latvian weightlifter, politician and Olympic competitor

Masculine given names
Latvian masculine given names